"Gangsta Walk" is a song by American rapper Coolio, released in August 2006 as the lead single from his sixth studio album The Return of the Gangsta. The song features American rapper Snoop Dogg and uncredited vocals by rapper Gangsta Lu. It was premiered in a ceremony in Milan dedicated to the Italian debut of Coolio.

Music video
The music video is a futuristic studio and 3D graphic-designed piece directed by Marco Gentile. It was filmed in Los Angeles in January 2006. It features Snoop Dogg dressed in black in a white control room surrounded by women wearing white uniforms. Coolio can be seen in a parking basement.

Remixes
 "Gangsta Walk" (Pastaboys Main Mix) – 5:49
 "Gangsta Walk" (DJ Remo Radio Mix) – 3:59
 "Gangsta Walk" (DJ Remo Vocal Walk Mix) – 5:49

Charts

References

2006 singles
Coolio songs
Snoop Dogg songs
Songs written by Snoop Dogg
Gangsta rap songs
G-funk songs